Interstate 90 (I-90) in the US state of Minnesota runs for  across the southern side of the state, parallel to the Iowa state line. The route connects the cities of Worthington, Albert Lea, Austin, and Rochester.

Route description
I-90 enters the state from South Dakota near Beaver Creek. This part of Minnesota has flat to gently rolling terrain and is the beginnings of Corn Belt farmland. The flat terrain is often subject to blowing and drifting snow in colder months, and the western portions of the highway are closed multiple times each winter.

Rock County, where I-90 enters Minnesota, is one of the only counties in the state lacking a natural lake.  The change from semiarid to a wetter climate happens slowly moving eastbound on I-90 through southern Minnesota. The route passes through the cities of Luverne, Adrian, Worthington, Jackson, Fairmont, and Blue Earth. I-90 has an interchange with I-35 at Albert Lea.

East of the city of Austin, I-90 changes direction slightly and heads toward Rochester, and the route enters a much more hilly landscape. This is the Driftless Area of southeast Minnesota. Unlike the rest of the state, where the most recent glaciations left terrain that is either flat or rolling under a deposit of glacial till, this area escaped the most recent glaciation. The bedrock to the top of the I-90 road cuts is noticeable at this point. The other notable feature of this area are deep, steep valleys cut by water that poured through this area as the ice cap melted.

I-90 drops into the scenic Mississippi River valley just west of Dresbach. The carriageways split apart as they descend, and they rejoin west of the junction with US Highway 61 (US 61). I-90 then parallels the Mississippi River before turning east and crossing the Dresbach Bridge over the river into Wisconsin.

I-90 is atypical in that, just across the Minnesota–Wisconsin state line, (immediately west of the community of Dakota) the median is wide enough that farms exist between the road beds.

Legally, the Minnesota section of I-90 is defined as unmarked Legislative Route 391 in the Minnesota Statutes. I-90 is not marked with this legislative number along the actual highway.

History

I-90 in Minnesota was authorized as part of the original Interstate network in 1956. The first section of I-90 in Minnesota constructed was the bypass of Austin in 1961. Plaques dedicating the pavement completion and describing the significance of this segment are on display at the rest area. Since being overlaid with bituminous paving in 2006, the original  gold-colored cement concert line marking the completion of I-90 has been replaced with gold paint on just the shoulder portions of the roadway at the same location.

I-90 in Minnesota closely follows the route of old US 16 over most of its route except from just east of Austin, where I-90 turns toward Rochester and is constructed on a new alignment not previously covered by a highway. The section of I-90 east of Rochester was constructed just south of US 14 and south of the city of Winona.

I-90 served as a replacement for old US 16 between the South Dakota state line and I-90's interchange with present-day Minnesota State Highway 16 (MN 16) at Dexter.

Exit list

References

*Steve Riner Details of Routes 76 to 100. Unofficial Minnesota Highways Page. Accessed January 12, 2009.

90
 Minnesota
Transportation in Rock County, Minnesota
Transportation in Nobles County, Minnesota
Transportation in Jackson County, Minnesota
Transportation in Martin County, Minnesota
Transportation in Faribault County, Minnesota
Transportation in Freeborn County, Minnesota
Transportation in Mower County, Minnesota
Transportation in Olmsted County, Minnesota
Transportation in Winona County, Minnesota